The 2017 Delta State Statesmen football team represented  Delta State University in the 2017 NCAA Division II football season. They were led by fifth-year head coach Todd Cooley. The Statesmen will played their home games at McCool Stadium and were members of the Gulf South Conference.

Schedule
Delta State announced its 2017 football schedule on December 27, 2016 which consists of six home and five away games in the regular season. The Statesmen will host GSC foes Florida Tech, Valdosta State, West Alabama and West Georgia, and will travel to Mississippi College, North Alabama, Shorter, and West Florida.

The Statesmen will host two of the three non-conference games against Chowan of the Central Intercollegiate Athletic Association and Tarleton State of the Lone Star Conference and will travel to North Greenville whom is independent from a conference.

Rankings

References

Delta State
Delta State Statesmen football seasons
Delta State Statesmen football